Shaktan Thampuran Private Bus Stand is a private bus terminal in Kerala, India and is located at the southern part of the Thrissur city. This bus stand is only 1 km away from Thrissur city.
 As of 2015, over 1200 buses conduct service in the terminal and over 3500 services are conducted daily.

References

Transport in Thrissur
Bus stations in Kerala